is a trans-Neptunian object and damocloid on a cometary-like orbit from the outer Solar System, approximately  in diameter. It was first observed on 22 June 2017 by the Pan-STARRS survey at Haleakala Observatory in Hawaii, United States.

Orbit and classification 

 orbits the Sun at a distance of 4.5–3,419 AU once every 70,825 years (semi-major axis of 1712 AU). Its orbit has an eccentricity of 0.9974 and an inclination of 56° with respect to the ecliptic.

As it has an eccentricity higher than 0.50, the distant object is labelled an (other) unusual object by the Minor Planet Center. The Johnston's Archive groups it to the damocloids, due to its extreme orbital elements and a TJupiter of less than 2, while in JPL's Small Body Database, it is a trans-Neptunian object with a semi-major axis larger than that of Neptune. 

It is by far the most distant and eccentric known asteroid orbiting the Sun, varying in its distance from the Sun over its orbit by 99.89% from slightly within the orbit of Jupiter, to more than 7,000 times Earth's distance to the Sun. While its orbit extends to the inner Oort cloud, it may not be a member of it, as it approaches very near to Saturn, implying Saturn has either captured a past Oort Cloud object onto this orbit, or it was a centaur ejected by Saturn from a much smaller orbit. However, it would be impossible to project its orbit far enough into the past to determine which scenario is true.

Like most objects on an extremely distant orbit around the Sun, 's barycentric orbit is very different from its heliocentric orbit, the latter being based only on the current position of the Solar System barycenter, and the former is based on the long-term movement of the barycenter. While the heliocentric aphelion is 7,000–9,000 AU, depending on the calculation, the current barycentric aphelion (as of 2018) is only 1,700 AU. Before its perihelion in 2016 (after that of ~30500 BC), it reached 2,000 AU from the sun around ~14300 BC.

Physical characteristics 
Very little is known for certain about the body's physical characteristics. The Johnston's Archive assumes a generic distant-object albedo of 0.09 and calculates a diameter of 8 kilometers. Like other distant objects, it is probably also fairly red in appearance due to tholins on its surface.

See also 
 List of Solar System objects by greatest aphelion

References

External links 
 
 

Damocloids
Trans-Neptunian objects

Minor planet object articles (unnumbered)

20170622